Barrio Orellana is a barrio (neighborhood) located in the city of Guayaquil, Ecuador and one of the oldest in the city.

History
It is more than 65 years old. Originally, it was a housing complex aimed at professionals and developed by the Pension Fund (current Ecuadorian Institute of Social Security).

Nowadays, Barrio Orellana is a commercial sector and very transited by vehicles. In its vicinity there are medical centers, financial, hotels, importers, buildings for office rental, ministerial, banking, and educational dependencies.

References

Neighborhoods of Guayaquil